The National Museum in Kraków, popularly abbreviated as MNK, is the largest museum in Poland, and the main branch of Poland's National Museum, which has several independent branches with permanent collections around the country. Established in 1879, the Museum consists of 21 departments which are divided by art period: 11 galleries, 2 libraries, and 12 conservation workshops. It holds some 780,000 art objects, spanning from classical archeology to modern art, with special focus on Polish painting.

Location
Kraków National Museum was first housed at the upper floor of the Renaissance Sukiennice building located at the Main Square in the Kraków Old Town, now home to one of its most popular divisions in the city. The construction of the Museum's contemporary New Main Building located at 3 Maja Street, started in 1934, but was interrupted by World War II. It was fully completed only in 1992, after the collapse of the Eastern Bloc. The collections – consisting of several hundred thousand items in total – are kept in big part in the Main Building where the administrative offices are located, but also in the nine of its divisions around the city.

During World War II the collection was looted by the German fascist invaders. After the war the Polish Government retrieved many of the works seized by the Germans. Still more than 1,000 artifacts are missing, including The Fight Between Carnival and Lent (which Polish authorities allege was stolen in 1939 by German invaders, reportedly taken away and sold in Vienna, and currently resides in the Kunsthistorisches Museum there) by Pieter Bruegel the Elder (donated to the Museum in 1937 by Stanisław Ursyn-Rusiecki) and priceless others.

Collections
The Main Building features the newly renovated upper Gallery of the Twentieth Century Polish Art, one of the largest galleries of painting and sculpture from the late 19th century on in Poland, with most celebrated artwork by Jacek Malczewski, Leon Wyczółkowski, Włodzimierz Tetmajer; an extensive collection of works by Stanisław Wyspiański; and also, works by artists of the interwar and postwar periods: the Polish cubists, expressionists, colorists, the avant-garde of the 1930s, and representatives of New Directions from the 1960s.

Paintings in the collection include masterpieces of the Young Poland movement (Konrad Krzyżanowski, Olga Boznańska, Józef Pankiewicz, Władysław Ślewiński, Wacław Szymanowski, Ludwik Puget, Jan Stanisławski, Tadeusz Makowski). Polish avant-garde is represented by Zbigniew Pronaszko, Leon Chwistek, Tytus Czyżewski, Stanisław Osostowicz, Eugeniusz Waniek, Jan Cybis, Hanna Rudzka-Cybisowa, Artur Nacht-Samborski, Jan Szancenbach, Józef Czapski, Piotr Potworowski, Wacław Taranczewski, Juliusz Joniak.

The collection of post-war art includes works by Tadeusz Kantor, Jonasz Stern, Maria Jarema, Jerzy Nowosielski, Andrzej Wróblewski, Katarzyna Kobro, Alina Szapocznikow, Maria Pinińska-Bereś, Katarzyna Kozyra. It also holds works by a wide range of influential contemporary Polish artists including Grzegorz Sztwiertnia, Rafał Bujnowski, Wilhelm Sasnal, Jadwiga Sawicka, Leon Tarasewicz, Stanisław Rodziński, Jan Pamuła, and Jan Tarasin.

Militaria
The Main Building has a vast display of militaria ranging from 12th to 20th century, including Polish armor from 16th and 17th centuries, Polish sabers, firearms, saddles and caparisons, military uniforms from 18th to 20th century, military orders, medals, and distinctions. The Museum holdings also include a collection of Western and Eastern European weapons. The militaria are presented at the "Arms and Colours" exhibition.

Decorative arts
Decorative arts and crafts are exhibited in the Decorative Arts and Crafts Gallery, with gold, silver and precious stone artifacts ranging from twelfth to eighteenth century; copper, pewter and iron objects, such as bowls and wrought iron chests; old furniture, musical instruments, clocks, ceramics and glass, notably stained glass from the churches of Kraków. The Museum has one of Poland's largest collections of Polish and Oriental antique rugs and carpets, as well as a collection of sixteenth to twentieth century costumes.

Museum Divisions
The Main Building, at 3 Maja St., featuring nearly 500 works by Poland's leading modern artists.
Gallery of the 19th Century Polish Art in Sukiennice, with the collection of some of the best known paintings of the Young Poland Movement, including sculpture.
Czartoryski Museum, Library and Arsenal, world-famous for Leonardo's painting of Lady with an Ermine. The museum has other old masters on display including dramatic landscape by Rembrandt.
The latest division called EUROPEUM with Brueghel among a hundred Western European paintings was inaugurated in 2013.
Bishop Erazm Ciołek Palace with polish gothic, renaissance and baroque art
Stanisław Wyspiański Museum
 Jan Matejko House on Floriańska Street
Józef Mehoffer House - artist's house
Szołayski's House - temporary exhibitions
Emeryk Hutten-Czapski Museum - numismatic collection
Karol Szymanowski Museum at Villa Atma in Zakopane
Cracovia Hotel
In 2009 a new project "Museum Forum" was launched to promote art in front of National Museum's Main Building. The winning design from architect Michal Bernasik was than chosen.

Gallery

Wartime losses

See also
Culture of Kraków
National Museum, Poznań
National Museum, Warsaw
National Museum, Wrocław
Culture of Poland
Beautiful Virgin Mary from Krużlowa

Notes

External links

National Museum in Krakow at Krakow-Poland.com. Retrieved November 30, 2012 from the Internet Archive
National Museum in Kraków at Culture.pl 
Virtual tour of the National Museum, Kraków provided by Google Arts & Culture

Museums established in 1879
Art museums and galleries in Poland
Poland
Museums in Kraków
Archaeological museums in Poland
1879 establishments in Austria-Hungary
Military and war museums in Poland
Registered museums in Poland